The Verhees D-Plane 1 is a Belgian homebuilt flying wing, designed by Verhees Engineering and supplied as plans for amateur construction.

Design and development
The D-Plane 1 features a cantilever mid-wing, a single-seat enclosed cockpit, semi-retractable tandem landing gear with small tail and wingtip wheels and a single engine in tractor configuration.  Control surfaces include an elevon at the trailing edge of each wing and a conventional vertical stabilizer with a rudder.

The aircraft is made chiefly from sheet aluminum. The single nose-mounted wheel retracts while the tail and wing tip wheels are fixed. The recommended engine is the 1.6 litre displacement  Subaru EA71 four-stroke flat-4 (boxer) automotive conversion powerplant.

By 2011 only the prototype D-Plane 1 had flown, but development work had begun on the design of the two-seat D-Plane 2.

Specifications (D-Plane 1)

References

External links

Homebuilt aircraft
Single-engined tractor aircraft
Flying wings
Aircraft first flown in 2004